Darjeeling Government College is a co-educational government-funded college established in 1948 in Darjeeling, West Bengal, India. The college is in North Point, Darjeeling.

Courses

It offers postgraduate courses in Botany, Zoology, English and Nepali and undergraduate courses in Nepali, English, Bengali, History, Hindi, Economics, Urdu, Modern Tibetan, Geography, Political Science, Philosophy, Physics, Chemistry, Mathematics, Botany, Zoology, Microbiology, Commerce and Computer Science.

Accreditation
The college is recognized by the University Grants Commission (UGC).

See also

References

External links
Official website
University of North Bengal
University Grants Commission
National Assessment and Accreditation Council

Universities and colleges in Darjeeling district
Colleges affiliated to University of North Bengal
Education in Darjeeling
Educational institutions established in 1948
1948 establishments in India